is a Japanese footballer who plays for Thespakusatsu Gunma.

Career

Club
On 5 January 2018, Hatao signed for Nagoya Grampus.

Career statistics

Club

References

External links

Profile at Ventforet Kofu

1990 births
Living people
Waseda University alumni
Association football people from Tokyo
Japanese footballers
J1 League players
J2 League players
Ventforet Kofu players
Nagoya Grampus players
Omiya Ardija players
Thespakusatsu Gunma players
Association football defenders